The WTCR Race of Macau, previously Guia Race of Macau and WTCC Guia Race of Macau, is an international touring car race, and currently a round of the World Touring Car Cup. It is held on the temporary 6.2 km Guia Circuit on the streets of Macau, the Special Administrative Region of the People's Republic of China as part of the Macau Grand Prix weekend. Before 2005 when the World Touring Car Championship began, the Guia race had been run annually as a one-off international touring car race.

History
Since its first running in 1972, the race has been won by international touring car greats such as Tom Walkinshaw, Johnny Cecotto, Roberto Ravaglia, Emanuele Pirro, Joachim Winkelhock and Andy Priaulx.

Historically it is also one of the most popular races of the weekend as it featured cars that are commonly seen on the Hong Kong and Macau roads.

World Touring Car Championship
The Guia Race of Macau has been the final round of the World Touring Car Championship since the series was relaunched in 2005. It often attracts local drivers competing alongside the series regulars, such as André Couto and Ao Chi Hong.

The championship has been decided in Macau every year since 2005.

Previous championship status
Prior to being a World Touring Car Championship round, the Guia Race had previously been an FIA Championship round. In 1994, it was a round of the Asia-Pacific Touring Car Championship. The race also acted as a point scoring round for the Asian Touring Car Championship from 2000 to 2003.

Technical regulation changes
The race has run to different touring car rules as European touring car championships went through their own changes. The race was run to European Group 5 regulations in the early eighties, then adopted FIA Group A rules between 1983 and 1990. It then ran to DTM rules from 1991 to 1993 before changing to Super Touring rules in 1994. From 2000, it started using Super Production regulations until 2004, when it sampled Super 2000 machinery before being upgraded to a round of the FIA WTCC.

Sporting regulation changes
The race has changed in format over the years, from the 30 lapper back in the Group A era to the current, double race format with each race lasting 9 laps. Prior to becoming a round of the WTCC in 2005, the race was staged over two legs, with the winner being declared as the driver with the best time aggregated from both legs.

Sponsors
The race has been sponsored by the Sociedade de Turismo e Diversões de Macau (STDM) since 2004. STDM boss Stanley Ho has presented the trophies to the race winners on the podium since the sponsorship began.

Results 

 The car was in fact, a Porsche 911 Carrera RSR 3.0 with 935 bodykit.

World Touring Car Championship years

TCR International Series years

World Touring Car Cup years

TCR China Touring Car Championship years

Notes

TCR Asia Challenge years

Most wins 
After the "official" inaugural race in 1972

By driver

By nationality of drivers

By manufacturer

See also
 Guia Circuit
 World Touring Car Championship

References

External links

 Macau Grand Prix
 FIA World Touring Car Championship

Macau Grand Prix
Macau
World Touring Car Cup races